In baseball, a complete game (denoted by CG) is the act of a pitcher pitching an entire game without the benefit of a relief pitcher. A pitcher who meets this criterion will be credited with a complete game regardless of the number of innings played - pitchers who throw an entire official game that is shortened by rain will still be credited with a complete game, while starting pitchers who are relieved in extra innings after throwing nine or more innings will not be credited with a complete game. A starting pitcher who is replaced by a pinch hitter in the final half inning of a game will still be credited with a complete game.

Cy Young is the all-time leader in complete games with 749 and the only player to complete more than 700 games. Pud Galvin is second all-time with 646 career complete games and the only other player to complete more than 600 games.

Key

List

Sources

Baseball-Reference.com

References

Complete games leaders
Major League Baseball statistics